Kim Moon-hi (born 28 June 1988) is a South Korean badminton player. Kim who educated at the SacredHeart Girl's High School in Jeonju was part of the Korean junior team that won the bronze medal at the 2005 Asian Junior Championships and made it to the gold medal in 2006. She also won the girls' singles bronze medal at the 2006 World Junior Championships, and helped the team clinch the gold medal. For her achievements in the junior tournaments, she received the Korea Sports Council's Scholarship. Kim later educated at the Korea National Sport University. Played for the Daekyo Noonnoppi team, Kim was awarded as Most Valuable Players at the Korean Spring League tournament. She  is now pursuing a master's degree in sport psychology at the Kyonggi University.

Achievements

World Junior Championships 
Girls' singles

BWF International Challenge/Series
Women's singles

 BWF International Challenge tournament
 BWF International Series tournament

References

External links
 
 
 

1988 births
Living people
People from Gimje
South Korean female badminton players
Korea National Sport University alumni
Sportspeople from North Jeolla Province